The Holy Transfiguration Monastery Church is a monastery church in Mingul, Gjirokastër County, Albania. It is a Cultural Monument of Albania.

References

Cultural Monuments of Albania
Buildings and structures in Gjirokastër
Churches in Gjirokastër